Emmanuel Mensah (born 30 June 1994 in Accra) is a Ghanaian professional footballer who last played as a winger for Gamma Ethniki club Paniliakos F.C.

Club statistics

Updated to games played as of 4 May 2014.

References
 
 MLSZ 

1994 births
Living people
Footballers from Accra
Ghanaian footballers
Ghanaian expatriate footballers
Association football forwards
Budapest Honvéd FC players
FK Bodva Moldava nad Bodvou players
MFK Zemplín Michalovce players
FK Frýdek-Místek players
KF Laçi players
Atromitos F.C. players
FK Partizani Tirana players
Nemzeti Bajnokság I players
Slovak Super Liga players
2. Liga (Slovakia) players
Kategoria Superiore players
Super League Greece players
Czech National Football League players
Ghanaian expatriate sportspeople in Slovakia
Ghanaian expatriate sportspeople in the Czech Republic
Ghanaian expatriate sportspeople in Albania
Ghanaian expatriate sportspeople in Greece
Ghanaian expatriate sportspeople in Hungary
Expatriate footballers in Slovakia
Expatriate footballers in the Czech Republic
Expatriate footballers in Albania
Expatriate footballers in Greece
Expatriate footballers in Hungary